Mordecai Aaron Günzburg (3 December 1795 – 5 November 1846), also known by the acronym Remag and the pen name Yonah ben Amitai, was a Lithuanian Jewish writer, translator, and educator. He was a leading member of the Haskalah in Vilna, and is regarded as the "Father of Hebrew Prose."

Biography
Günzburg was born into a prominent Jewish family in Salant (now Salantai, Lithuania) in 1795. His father Yehuda Asher (1765–1823), under whom he studied Hebrew and Talmud, was one of the early members of the Haskalah in Russia, and wrote treatises on mathematics and Hebrew grammar. Günzburg was engaged at the age of twelve, and married two years later, whereupon he went to live with his in-laws at Shavly. He continued his studies under his father-in-law until 1816. From there Günzburg went to Polangen and Mitau, Courland, where he taught Hebrew and translated legal papers into German. He did not stay in Courland long, and after a period of wandering settled in Vilna in 1835.

In 1841, he founded with Shlomo Salkind ( 1868) the first secular Jewish school in Lithuania, which he headed until his death in 1846 at the age of fifty-one.

Work
Günzburg was best known for his series of histories of contemporary Europe. His first major publication was Sefer gelot ha-aretz (1823), an adaption into Hebrew of Joachim Heinrich Campe's Die Entdeckung von Amerika, a Yiddish translation of which he released the following year as Di entdekung fun Amerike. In 1835, he published the first volume of his universal history Toldot bnei ha-adam, adapted from 's Handbuch der weltgeschichte. (A few chapters of the second volume would later be published in the Leket Amarim, a supplement to Ha-Melitz, in 1889.) In the same genre he wrote Ittote Russiya (1839), a history of Russia, and Ha-Tzarfatim be-Russiya (1842) and Pi ha-ḥerut (1844), accounts of the Napoleonic Wars.

Among his other publications were Malakhut Filon ha-Yehudi (1836), an translation from German of Philo's embassy to Caligula, and the anthology Devir (1844), an eclectic collection of letters, tales, and sketches. Many of Günzburg's works were published posthumously, most notably his autobiography Aviezer (1863, composed between 1828 and 1845), as well as Ḥamat Dammeshek (1860), a history of the Damascus affair of 1840, and the satirical poem Tikkun Lavan ha-Arami (1864).

He struggled energetically against Kabbalah and superstition as the sources of the Ḥasidic movement, but he was at the same time opposed to the free thought and proto-Reform movements.

Selected publications

  Later published as Masa Kolumbus, o, gelot ha-aretz ha-ḥadashah [Columbus' Voyage; or, Discovery of the New Land].
  
  
  A letter-writing manual.
  
  A history of Russia.
  
  A refutation of Max Lilienthal's Maggid Yeshuah.
  
  
  A history of Europe from 1770 to 1812.

References
 

1795 births
1846 deaths
19th-century essayists
19th-century Jews
19th-century Lithuanian writers
Autobiographers
Dramatists and playwrights from the Russian Empire
Essayists from the Russian Empire
Hebrew-language playwrights
Historians from the Russian Empire
Historians of the Napoleonic Wars
Jewish writers from the Russian Empire
Lithuanian dramatists and playwrights
Lithuanian essayists
19th-century Lithuanian historians
Lithuanian Jews
Lithuanian male writers
Lithuanian translators
Male essayists
Male non-fiction writers
Male writers from the Russian Empire
People of the Haskalah
Memoirists from the Russian Empire
People from Salantai
Translators from German
Translators from the Russian Empire
Translators to Hebrew
Writers from Vilnius
German–Hebrew translators